Rambi Bazar is an urban village lying near Teesta River in the Kalimpong I CD block in the Kalimpong Sadar subdivision of the Kalimpong district  in the state of West Bengal, India. The town lies on the National Highway 10 connecting Siliguri and Gangtok. Teesta Low Dam - III Hydropower Plant and Riyang railway station lies in Rambi Bazar.

Geography

Location

Area overview
The map alongside shows the Kalimpong Sadar subdivision of Kalimpong district. This region is characterized by abruptly rising hills and numerous small streams. It is a predominantly rural area with 77.67% of the population living in rural areas and only 22.23% living in the urban areas. While Kalimpong is the only municipality, Dungra is the sole census town in the entire area. The economy is agro-based and there are 6 tea gardens in the Gorubathan CD block. In 2011, Kalimpong subdivision had a literacy rate of 81.85%, comparable with the highest levels of literacy in the districts of the state. While the first degree college in the subdivision was established at Kalimpong in 1962the entire subdivision (and now the entire district), other than the head-quarters, had to wait till as late as 2015 (more than half a century) to have their first degree colleges at Pedong and Gorubathan.

Note: The map alongside presents some of the notable locations in the subdivision. All places marked in the map are linked in the larger full screen map.

Demographics
According to the 2011 Census of India, Rambi Bazar had a total population of 1,000 of which 510 (51%) were males and 490 (49%) were females. There were 104 persons in the age range of 0 to 6 years. The total number of literate people in Rambi Bazar was 775 (86.50% of the population over 6 years).

Economy

Teesta Low Dam - III Hydropower Plant produces 132 MW of electricity.

Healthcare
Rambi Rural Hospital, with 30 beds, is the major government medical facility in the Kalimpong I CD block. There are primary health centres at Samthar (with 6 beds) and Teesta Bazaar (with 10 beds).

Transport
National Highway 10 passes through Rambi Bazar.
The town also lies near Riyang Railway Station which is the part of under-construction Sivok Rangpo Railway line.

References

Villages in Kalimpong district